The 2011 Barcelona Open Banco Sabadell (also known as the Torneo Godó) was a tennis tournament played on outdoor clay courts. It was the 59th edition of the event known this year as the Barcelona Open Banco Sabadell, and was part of the ATP World Tour 500 series of the 2011 ATP World Tour. It took place at the Real Club de Tenis Barcelona in Barcelona, Spain, from April 16 through April 24, 2011. The defending champion was Fernando Verdasco, but was absent from the tournament in 2011.

Points and prize money

Points

Prize money
The Barcelona Open Banc Sabadell has slightly raised the prize money for this year's edition, which turns it into one of the highest paid tennis tournaments in its category. The singles winner will go home with €290,000 (€4,000 more than last year).

Entrants

Seeds

 Rankings as of April 11, 2011.

Other entrants
The following players received wildcards into the main draw:
  Juan Mónaco
  Albert Ramos
  Gerard Granollers
  Pablo Carreño Busta
  Andrey Kuznetsov

The following players received entry from the qualifying draw:

  Flavio Cipolla
  Simon Greul
  Vincent Millot
  Jarkko Nieminen
  Benoît Paire
  Édouard Roger-Vasselin
  Simone Vagnozzi

The following players received entry from a Lucky loser spot:
  Rui Machado
  Mischa Zverev

Notable withdrawals
 Tommy Robredo (hamstring injury)
 Tomáš Berdych (gastroenteritis)
 Andy Murray (elbow injury)

Champions

Singles

 Rafael Nadal def.  David Ferrer, 6–2, 6–4
It was Nadal's 2nd title of the year and 45th of his career. It was his 6th title at Barcelona, also winning from 2005 to 2009.

Doubles

 Santiago González /  Scott Lipsky def.  Bob Bryan /  Mike Bryan, 5–7, 6–2, [12–10]

References

External links 
Official Website

 
2011
Barcelona Open Banco Sabadell
2011 in Catalan sport
Bar